HMS Ranger  is an  patrol and training vessel of the British Royal Navy, based in HMNB Portsmouth. She is affiliated to Sussex and Brighton Universities' University Royal Naval Unit (or SUSURNU), which has its offices at the University of Sussex, Brighton. Her badge is a ship's wheel superimposed on seven blue roundels, representing the seven seas.

Construction
HMS Ranger was built at Shoreham-by-Sea by Watercraft Ltd. in 1987.

Operational history
Being a cadet training ship, Ranger is not equipped with live weaponry unless required for a supervised training exercise. It is fitted for - but not with - a 20 mm 85 GAM Cannon, as well as storage for four standard service rifles and two GPMGs.

Alongside  she was deployed on the Thames for the Thames Diamond Jubilee Pageant as part of the Royal Squadron escorting the Royal Barge. Subsequent to this, she departed upon a twelve-week deployment in company with Trumpeter,  and  around the Baltic, representing the UK at Kiel Week.

Role

Ranger provides sea training to members of the Sussex University Royal Naval Unit. She can also be tasked with maritime security, search and rescue and inshore patrol.

Affiliations
 Sussex and Brighton University Royal Naval Unit
 Seaford College CCF
 Lewes District Council
 TS Defiance (Newhaven & Seaford Sea Cadets)
 Bond of Friendship - Ocracoke, North Carolina

Notes

References

External links

 

Archer-class patrol vessels